Thai Empire may refer to:
Great Thai Empire, a name used under the idea of Pan-Thaiism in the 1930s–1940s
Other historical kingdoms of Thailand; see Siam (disambiguation)